Alexios Kalogeropoulos (born 26 July 2004) is a Greek professional footballer who plays as a defender for Olympiacos.

Career statistics

Club

Notes

References

2004 births
Living people
Greek footballers
Greece youth international footballers
Association football defenders
Asteras Tripolis F.C. players
Olympiacos F.C. players
People from Elis
Footballers from Western Greece
Olympiacos F.C. B players